Bosco d'amore (internationally released as Forest of Love) is a 1981 Italian drama film directed by Alberto Bevilacqua. It is loosely based on a novel of Giovanni Boccaccio.

It entered the competition at the 38th Venice International Film Festival.

Cast 
Monica Guerritore: Agnolella
Rodolfo Bigotti: Pietro
William Berger
Mario Feliciani
Orso Maria Guerrini
Gisela Hahn
Stanko Molnar
 Rina Franchetti

References

External links

1981 films
Italian drama films
Films directed by Alberto Bevilacqua
Films based on Italian novels
Films based on works by Giovanni Boccaccio
Films scored by Carlo Rustichelli
Films set in the 14th century
1980s Italian films